Judy Goodrich (born 9 June 1939) is a retired American foil fencer. She competed at the 1956 and 1960 Summer Olympics.

References

External links
 

1939 births
Living people
American female foil fencers
Fencers at the 1956 Summer Olympics
Fencers at the 1960 Summer Olympics
Olympic fencers of the United States
Sportspeople from Flint, Michigan
21st-century American women